The Queensland Ranger Association (QRA) represents and promotes the interests of Park Rangers in the state of Queensland, Australia.

Purpose
The objectives of the Association include -

to promote best practice in managing the Queensland environment by its members and participate in the enhanced performance of the management authorities for the Queensland environment.
to promote the awareness and importance of Industrial representation of its members and encourage the participation in Industrial issues through membership of a Union.
to represent its members in communication and negotiations with Officers of the management authorities of the Queensland environment.
monitor, protect and enhance employment, general working conditions and social justice issues affecting its members, and monitor and promote equity between regions.

Affiliated organisations
The Australian Ranger Federation
The Victorian Ranger Association
The International Ranger Federation

References

External links
Official QRA website
QRA FaceBook page
International Ranger Federation
Australian Ranger Federation
Victorian Ranger Association

Environment of Queensland
Professional associations based in Australia
Nature conservation organisations based in Australia